Copelatus tulagicus is a species of diving beetle. It is part of the subfamily Copelatinae in the family Dytiscidae. It was described by Félix Guignot in 1942.

References

tulagicus
Beetles described in 1942
Beetles of Australia